Water Valley Independent School District is a public school district based in the community of Water Valley, Texas, United States.

Located in western Tom Green County, the district extends into a portion of southwest Coke County.

Academic achievement
In 2009, the school district was rated "exemplary" by the Texas Education Agency.

Schools
Water Valley High School (grades 7-12)
Water Valley Elementary (grades PK-6)

Athletics
Water Valley High School plays eleven-man football.

See also

List of school districts in Texas

References

External links

School districts in Tom Green County, Texas
School districts in Coke County, Texas